The 1933 Tunis Grand Prix was a Grand Prix motor race held at the Carthage Street Circuit in Tunis, the capital of colonial Tunisia, on 26 March 1933. Tazio Nuvolari won the 37 lap race, driving for Scuderia Ferrari, Alfa Romeo's works team, while his teammate, Baconin Borzacchini, finished second. Third place was taken by the privateer Maserati of Goffredo Zehender.

Entries

Starting grid
Grid positions were allocated in numerical order.

Classification

Race

References

Tunis
1933 in African sport
Tunis
Motorsport in Tunisia